Margilan is a city (2022 pop. 242,500) in Fergana Region in eastern Uzbekistan. Administratively, Margilan is a district-level city, that includes the urban-type settlement Yangi Margilan. It is located at latitude 40°28' 16 N: longitude 71°43' 29 E. at an altitude of 487 meters.

In the south of the Fergana Valley lies Margilan, at the crossing of trade caravans from China to the west and vice versa, in a picturesque square. Margilan's root is in close association with the Silk Road opening. While it is not considered the birth of a city on this old caravan road, the Silk Road definitely made the center of silk and the head keeper of its secrets for Margilan. Margilio was renowned for their silk goods from far west to far east as far back as the 10th century – the largest city in the Ferghana Valley.

According to European legend, Margilan was founded by Alexander the Great. On a lunch stop, he was given chicken (murgh; in ) and bread (nan;), from which the town took its name. More reliable records indicate that Margilan was an important stop on the Silk Road by the 9th century AD, along the route going across the Alay Mountains to Kashgar.

Writing in the early 16th century, the founder of the Mughal dynasty, Babur, mentioned that “the pomegranates and apricots are superb .... the game in Margilan is good; white deer may be found nearby. The people are Sarts. They are a feisty people, ready with their fists. The custom of exorcism is widespread throughout Transoxiana, and most of the renowned exorcists of Samarkand and Bukhara are Margilanis. The author of the Hidaya (Burhan al-Din al-Marghinani) was from a Margilan village called Rishtan”. This reputation for toughness extends to modern times. Margilan merchants were key players in Central Asian commerce, and were said to be a law unto themselves during Soviet days, when Margilan was the heart of Uzbekistan’s black market. Margilan today is also a stronghold of conservative Islam.

Economy
The town is the location of Uzbekistan’s largest traditional silk factory, the Yodgorlik Silk Factory. Employing over 2,000 workers, everything is done in the traditional manner, for an annual output of some 250,000 square meters of highly premium silk cloth

The neighboring Margilan Silk Factory employs 15,000 workers using modern machinery, and produces some 22 million square meters per year.  It is uncertain when the secrets of silk production came to the Fergana Valley, but certainly, Margilan has been active in the industry since ancient times.

Main sites

Yodgorlik Silk Factory 
Established in 1983 in an attempt to preserve traditional silk weaving techniques in the face of industrialisation, the Yodgorlik Silk Factory focuses on producing high quality handmade goods. It employs over 200 workers, and the full production process takes place in the factory, from the feeding of silk worms with mulberry leaves, to dyeing the silks with natural mineral and vegetable dyes, to weaving the silk. The factory is open to the public for guided tours, enabling tourists to learn about Margilan’s traditional silk weaving industry.

Margilan Silk Factory 
Margilan Silk Factory is a huge, state-run facility for industrial silk production. At its peak, it employed 15,000 workers, who produced up to 22 million square metres of silk each year. It is still possible to visit.

The Kumtepa Bazaar 
Kumtepa Bazaar is one of the most vibrant markets in Central Asia. It takes place on Sundays and Thursdays in a location 5km west of the city centre. It is a good place to buy textiles, fresh produce, and household goods.

Toron Mosque 
Toron Mosque is just north of Margilan’s Central Bazaar. It was founded in the 19th century by Said Akhmad Khodjaev, a wealthy philanthropist and advisor to the tsarist administration who fled to Margilan during the Bolshevik Revolution. In the 20th century, the building was used as a jail and then became an office. It now houses the Margilan Crafts Development Centre, which preserves traditional atlas and adras textile making technologies.

Istirokhat Bogi 
Margilan’s largest and most attractive park is the Istirokhat Bogi. It is well laid out with paths, lawns, and trees, and is popular with local families.

Khonakhan Mosque 
The Khonakhan Mosque (also known as the Khonaqoh Mosque) was built in the 16th century and has been renovated by the Ministry of Culture. The mosque has two impressive minarets, each 26m high, and original carved wooden pillars made from cedarwood by master craftsmen in Margilan. The carved wooden ceiling and chandelier hanging below the mosque’s dome are also attractive.

Said Akhmad Khodja Madrasseh – functioning 19th century school
 A statue honoring ill-fated Uzbek dancer Nurkhon Yuldasheva was built and placed in Margilan in Soviet times, but it was taken down shortly after the distestablishment of the Uzbek Soviet Socialist Republic in 1991.

See also
Nurkhon Yuldasheva

References

Populated places in Fergana Region
Cities in Uzbekistan